Mohammed Sabeel (Arabic:محمد سبيل) (born 8 September 1991) is an Emirati footballer. He currently plays as a defender for Ittihad Kalba.

Career
Mohammed Sabeel started his career at Al-Shabab and is a product of the Al-Shabab's youth system. and then he played with Al-Jazira Al-Hamra and Masafi.

Dubai
On 4 May 2015 left Masafi and signed with Dubai.

Ajman
On 7 August 2017 left Dubai and signed with Ajman. On 15 September 2017 , Mohammed Sabeel made his professional debut for Ajman against Al-Jazira in the Pro League.

Ittihad Kalba
On 20 June 2020 left Ajman and signed with Ittihad Kalba.

External links

References

1991 births
Living people
Emirati footballers
Al Shabab Al Arabi Club Dubai players
Al Jazirah Al Hamra Club players
Masafi Club players
Dubai CSC players
Ajman Club players
Al-Ittihad Kalba SC players
UAE Pro League players
UAE First Division League players
Association football defenders
Place of birth missing (living people)